Florence Island is the main island formed by the diked river delta of the Stillaguamish River as it flows into Port Susan on Puget Sound.

The historic Snohomish County settlement of Florence is located on the delta and gives the island its name. Florence Island is connected to the mainland by three bridges heading in the directions of Stanwood to the north, Silvana and Arlington to the east, and Warm Beach to the south.

References

Islands of Washington (state)